Stuart Thompson (born September 26, 1992 in Halifax, Nova Scotia) is a Canadian curler. He currently skips his own team on the World Curling Tour.

Career

Juniors
As a junior curler, Thompson won three Nova Scotia provincial titles. The first came in 2011, playing second for his brother Kendal's team. The team represented Nova Scotia at the 2011 Canadian Junior Curling Championships, where the team would just miss the playoffs, finishing with a 7-5 record. With the elder Kendal graduating from the junior ranks, Stuart formed his own junior team for the next season with himself skipping, teammates Scott Babin, Alex MacNeil and Paul Weingartshofer. The team won the 2012 provincial junior title and represented Nova Scotia at the 2012 Canadian Junior Curling Championships. Thompson led his rink to a 9-3 round robin record, tied for third with Manitoba. This put the team in a tiebreaker game for the final playoff spot, which they would lose. For the next season, Thompson continued as skip for his team, adding Luke Saunders to the rink, replacing Weingartshofer. The team would win the 2013 provincial junior championship and again represented Nova Scotia at that year's Canadian Juniors. There, the team finished with an 8-2 round robin record, good enough for second place. However, the team would lose in the semifinal against Manitoba's Matt Dunstone, settling for a bronze medal.

Thompson also played with his brother on the Saint Mary's University curling team. The team would finish with a 3-4 record at the 2011 CIS/CCA Curling Championships.

Men's
After juniors, Thompson was picked up to play third for former Brier champion Mark Dacey. With Dacey, Thompson would play in his first provincial men's championship at the 2014 Molson Coors Tankard. There, Dacey led the team all the way to the final, losing to Jamie Murphy. The next month the team played in Thompson's first ever Grand Slam event, the 2014 Syncrude National, with the team going 2-3, failing to advance to the playoffs.

The next season, the team won the 2014 Atlantic Curling Tour Championship, Thompson's first World Curling Tour event title. Later in the season, the team again played in the Nova Scotia men's championship, the 2015 Clearwater Men's Provincial Championship. The team had less luck, placing fourth. After the season, Thompson left the Dacey rink to form his own team as skip, with teammates Colten Steele, Travis Colter, and Alex MacNeil.

Thompson and his new team found success on the World Curling Tour, winning two events in 2015, the Bud Light Men's Cashspiel and the Spitfire Arms Cash Spiel. The team played in the 2016 provincial championships, finishing fourth with a 4-3 record.

Thompson began the 2016-17 season by winning the Lakeshore Curling Club Cashspiel. Two months later, his team won the Challenge Casino de Charlevoix event. At the 2017 Deloitte Tankard provincial championship, he led his team to a 5-2 round robin record, which put the rink into the playoffs. They won their semifinal match, but lost in the final to Jamie Murphy. The next season, Taylor Ardiel joined the lineup, replacing MacNeil at lead. At the 2018 Deloitte Tankard, they went 4-3 in the round robin, putting them in a three-way tiebreaker. They won both their tiebreak matches, but lost in the semifinal to Team Mark Dacey.

Thompson began the 2018-19 season by winning The Curling Store Cashspiel tour event. Thompson, led his team to victory in the 2019 Deloitte Tankard in Dartmouth, Nova Scotia qualifying his team for the 2019 Tim Hortons Brier in Brandon, Manitoba for the first time. Thompson beat out Team Jamie Murphy in a close 6-4 match to win the Tankard, avenging previous losses to Murphy at the Deloitte Tankard. The team had gone 5-2 in the round robin, but won both of their playoff matches to claim the Tankard. At the Brier, Thompson led Team Nova Scotia to a 3-4 record in pool play. The team won a second straight Curling Store Cashspiel in 2019 At the 2020 Deloitte Tankard, the team finished the round robin with a 4–3 record, and then lost in a tiebreaker match to Chad Stevens.

Personal life
Thompson works as a mechanical technologist with Geospectrum Technologies Inc.

References

External links

Living people
1992 births
Curlers from Nova Scotia
Sportspeople from Halifax, Nova Scotia
Saint Mary's Huskies players
Canadian male curlers
21st-century Canadian people